A spasso nel tempo is a 1996 Italian science fiction adventure comedy film directed by Carlo Vanzina.

The film is included in the Italian sub-genre of cinepanettoni. According to Adam O'Leary, A spasso nel tempo and its sequel are «farcical elaborations of the Back to the Future films which riff on schoolbook history and on film and television culture».

Plot
Two Italian families meet in Universal Pictures' amusement park. Ascanio Colonna (Ascanio Orsini Varaldo in the original version) is a Roman prince, who immediately goes into battle with the Milanese Walter Colombo (Walter Boso in the original version), manager of a cinema. When the two families have to take the joust of Professor Mortimer's "Machine of Time", the machine jams right when Ascanio and Walter get on board. The two are sent in the Prehistoric era, and Professor Mortimer tries in every way to bring them back in the present era, making the two enemies a journey in all the eras of Time.

Cast
Christian De Sica as Ascanio Colonna
Massimo Boldi as Walter Colombo
Dean Jones as Professor Mortimer / Joe
Marco Messeri as Lorenzo il Magnifico
Ela Weber as Natasha
Veronica Logan as Michaela
 as Aspreno Colonna
 as Giusy
Erica Beltrami as Gina
 as Rosanna
Manuela Arcuri as young Rosanna

Release
The film opened at number two at the Italian box office, behind the second weekend of The Hunchback of Notre Dame, with a gross of $1,869,843 from 123 screens in its opening weekend. It became number one during the Christams holidays. A sequel entitled A spasso nel tempo – L'avventura continua was released in 1997.

References

External links
 

1996 films
Italian science fiction comedy films
Italian adventure films
Films about time travel
Films directed by Carlo Vanzina
Films scored by Manuel De Sica
1990s science fiction comedy films
1990s adventure films
1996 comedy films
1990s Italian films